There is a community of Serbs in Ukraine, which includes Ukrainian citizens of ethnic Serb descent or Serbian-born people residing in the country. According to the 2001 census, there were 623 citizens in Ukraine that declared Serb ethnicity. It is estimated that the community numbers ca. 1,000 (2012).

History

Russian Empire

Demographics
The 2001 census registered 623 citizens declaring Serb ethnicity (Національність: серби), out of whom 219 had Serbian citizenship, 104 Ukrainian, 218 Russian, 68 other.

The Serbian Ministry of Diaspora estimated in 2007 that there was a Serbian diaspora community numbering ca. 15,000 people in Ukraine. This data includes emigrants from Serbia as well as ethnic Serbs or other minorities who view Serbia as their nation-state.

In January 2012, it was estimated that the Serbian diaspora in the country only numbered 1,000.

Notable people

John of Tobolsk, prominent Eastern Orthodox ascetic and hierarch of the Russian Orthodox Church of Serbian descent
Yevgeny Vuchetich, prominent Soviet sculptor and artist of Serbian descent
Milla Jovovich, Ukrainian-born American model, actress, musician, and fashion designer of Serbian descent
Marko Devich, Serbian-born Ukrainian football player
Vladimir Dišljenkovic, Serbian-Born Ukrainian football player
Zlata Ognevich Singer

See also

Serbia–Ukraine relations
Slavo-Serbia
New Serbia (historical province)
 Ukrainians in Serbia

References

Sources

Дмитрієв, В.С., 2006. Серби в Україні (XVIII-початок XIX ст.).
Стрижок, О., 1993. Серби в Україні. Україна: наука і культура,-К, p.257.
Дмитрієв, В.С., 2005. Сербські переселенці в Україні: проблема міжетнічних зв’язків. Вісник Національного університету імені Тараса Шевченка. Історія, pp.77-79.

Ukraine
Ethnic groups in Ukraine
 
Ukraine
Ukraine
Ukraine